Ksenia Chernykh is a Russian mountain bike orienteer and World Champion. She won individual gold medals at the 2007 and 2008 World MTB Orienteering Championships, and a relay gold medal in 2006.

Mountain bike orienteering career
Chernykh competed at the 2004 World MTB Orienteering Championships in Ballarat, where she placed 27th in the middle distance and 50th in the long distance. 
At the 2005 World Championships in  Banska Bystrica, she placed 18th in the middle distance, fifth in the long distance, and fifth with the Russian relay team. At the 2006 World MTB Orienteering Championships in Joensuu she placed 30th in the middle, won a silver medal in the long distance behind Christine Schaffner, and a gold medal in the relay, together with Nadia Mikriukova and Anna Ustinova on the Russian team. She won her first individual gold medals at the 2007 World MTB Orienteering Championships in Nove Mesto na Morave, winning the sprint ahead of Michaela Gigon, and the middle distance ahead of Hana Bajtošova. She won a silver medal in the long distance, and a silver medal in the relay. At the 2008 World MTB Orienteering Championships in Ostróda, she placed 23rd in the sprint, won a gold medal in the middle distance, placed eight in the long distance, and silver medal in the relay. In Ben Shemen in 2009 she placed sixth in the long distance, 26th in the sprint, 27th in the middle distance, and won a bronze medal with the Russian relay team. At the 2010 World Championships in Montalegre she won a silver medal in the long distance, placed fifth with the Russian relay team, placed 26th in the middle distance and 34th in the sprint.

References

Russian orienteers
Female orienteers
Russian female cyclists
Mountain bike orienteers
Year of birth missing (living people)
Living people
Place of birth missing (living people)
21st-century Russian women